The 1986 Miami Hurricanes football team represented the University of Miami during the 1986 NCAA Division I-A football season. It was the Hurricanes' 61st season of football. The Hurricanes were led by third-year head coach Jimmy Johnson and played their home games at the Orange Bowl. Miami outscored their opponents 420–136, including a 28-16 victory against the Oklahoma Sooners, who were the defending national champions and ranked No. 1 at the time. At 11-0, it was Miami's first undefeated regular season, which they finished ranked No. 1. They were invited to the Fiesta Bowl, which also served as the National Championship Game, and lost 14-10 to No. 2 Penn State, who was also undefeated.

Schedule

Rankings

Personnel

Season summary

at South Carolina

    
    
    
    
    
    
    
    

Melvin Bratton 10 Rush, 105 Yds
Michael Irvin 6 Rec, 101 Yds

at Florida

Texas Tech

Oklahoma

Northern Illinois

at West Virginia

at Cincinnati

Florida State

vs. Penn State (Fiesta Bowl)

1987 NFL Draft

References

Miami
Miami Hurricanes football seasons
Miami Hurricanes football